The Boruca language (in Boruca: Brúnkajk, also known as Bronka, Bronca, Brunca) is the native language of the Boruca people of Costa Rica. Boruca belongs to the Isthmian branch of the Chibchan languages. Though exact speaker numbers are uncertain, UNESCO’s Atlas of the World’s Languages in Danger has listed Boruca as "critically endangered". It was spoken fluently by only five women in 1986, while 30 to 35 others spoke it non-fluently. The rest of the tribe's 1,000 members speak Spanish. 

Boruca is taught as a second language at the local primary school Escuela Doris Z. Stone. One can hear Bronka words and phrases mixed into Spanish conversations but it is extremely rare to hear prolonged exchanges in Bronka.

Grammar 

The personal pronouns in Boruca (the ᵛ represents a glottal stop.) 

The numbers (the "n̈", "n" with the diaeresis "¨" on top may be unavailable in some fonts, it represents a slightly different sound from the normal n or ñ.)

Greetings 
¿Ishójcre rában? = What's up?

Morén, morén. = Fine, well.

See also
Brunca Sign Language

External links 

 Map of Boruca

References

Chibchan languages
Languages of Costa Rica
Endangered Chibchan languages